The Kenya women's national football team represents Kenya in women's football and is controlled by the Football Kenya Federation.

History
The first women's league in Kenya and national team were created in 1985 at a time when almost no country in the world had a women's national football team. The national team is nicknamed the Harambee Starlets and national team players are not full-time professional players.  They need to have other employment.

In 1993, Kenya Women's Football Federation was created and organised a national team that represented the country several times in international tournaments between its founding and 1996.  In 1996, the Kenya Women's Football Federation folded under pressure from FIFA and women's football was subsumed by the Kenya Football Federation, with women being represented in the organisation as a subcommittee. Kenya Football Federation took over the management of the women's national team.

In a 22 September 1998 game in Nairobi, Kenya beat South Africa 1-0.  In a match in the same city two days later, they lost to South Africa 1–2. In 2002, the national team played a game. The team played in qualifying matches for Olympics in 2003. In 2004, the team played 2 games.

The team played in qualifying matches for the African Cup of Nations in 2006. In 2006, the team played 3 games. In 2006, the national team had 3 training sessions a week. Djibouti women's national football team played Kenya in Nairobi on 26 March 2006, with Kenya winning 7–0, holding a lead of 4–0 at the half. On 22 July 2006, Kenya played Cameroon women's national football team in Yaounde. Cameroon was up 2–0 at the half and went on to win the game 4–0.  On 5 August 2006, Kenya played Cameroon in Nairobi. Cameroon was ahead 3–0 at the half and went on to win the game 5–0. In the 2007 African Games qualifying tournament, Kenya beat Tanzania 2–1. In 2010, the country had a team at the African Women's Championships during the preliminary round but withdrew and ultimately did not compete.

In 2011, Grace Sayo was the team captain. The country did not have a team competing at the 2011 All Africa Games. The country was supposed to participate in qualifiers for the 2011 All Africa Games but the national federation withdrew the team after ten of the team's players had already traveled from the countryside to the capital for a training camp in preparation for an opening match against Tanzania.  Women's football administrators in the country asked the government to investigate why the national football federation withdrew from the competition, while still having money available to send the men's national team around the continent for competitions.  If they had played the match, it would have been their first international match since 2006 when they beat Djibouti. In the 2012 Africa Women's Seniors Championships, the team withdrew from the competition prior to the first round qualifier.

In March 2012, the team was ranked the 135th best in the world and the 31st best in the CAF.  Kenya's average FIFA world rank is 120. In 2011, they were ranked 136. In 2010, they were ranked 128. In 2009, they were ranked 92. In 2008, they were ranked 117. In 2007, they were ranked 144.  In 2006, they were ranked 135. Their best move in world rankings was an increase of 24 in June 2007.  Their worst move down world rankings was a loss of 27 in December 2007.

In May 2017, the Football Kenya Federation signed a 3-year partnership with kits manufacturer Mafro Sports to providing the kits for all national teams, as well as junior categories. The national team will use red jerseys for home matches, white jerseys for away matches, and green jerseys for matches played on neutral venues.

Background and development
Early development of the women's game at the time colonial powers brought football to the continent was limited as colonial powers in the region tended to take make concepts of patriarchy and women's participation in sport with them to local cultures that had similar concepts already embedded in them. The lack of later development of the national team on a wider international level symptomatic of all African teams is a result of several factors, including  limited access to education, poverty amongst women in the wider society, and fundamental inequality present in the society that occasionally allows for female specific human rights abuses.  When quality female football players are developed, they tend to leave for greater opportunities abroad. Continent wide, funding is also an issue, with most development money coming from FIFA, not the national football association. Future, success for women's football in Africa is dependent on improved facilities and access by women to these facilities.  Attempting to commercialise the game and make it commercially viable is not the solution, as demonstrated by the current existence of many youth and women's football camps held throughout the continent.

Women's football gained popularity in the country during the 1990s.  In 1993, this popularity led to the creation of the female run Kenya Women's Football Federation, who organised a national team that represented the country several times in international tournaments between its founding and 1996.  In 1996, the Kenya Women's Football Federation folded under pressure from FIFA and women's football was subsumed by the Kenya Football Federation, with women being represented in the organisation as a subcommittee. Football is the fourth most popular sport for women in the country, trailing behind volley, basketball and field hockey. In 1999, a woman referee from Kenya officiated a match between the Nigerian and South African women's teams in Johannesburg and was treated poorly by fans when she failed to call an offsides.  The game was delayed because of the ensuring violence, which included bricks being tossed at her. In 2006, there were 7,776 registered female football players of which 5,418 were registered, under-18 youth players and 2,358 were registered adult players.  This followed a pattern of increased registration of female football players in the country with 4,915 total registered players in 2000, 5,000 in 2001, 5,500 in 2002, 6,000 in 2003, 6,700 in 2004 and 7,100 in 2005. In 2006, there were 710 total football teams in the country, with 690 being mixed gendered teams and 20 being women only. In 2006, there were over 3,000 girls playing in seven different leagues around the country. Rights to broadcast the 2011 Women's World Cup in the country were bought by the African Union of Broadcasting.

Kenya Football Federation was created and joined FIFA in 1960.  Their kit includes red, green and white shirts, black shorts and black socks.  The federation does not have a full-time dedicated employee working on women's football.  Women's football is represented on the federation by specific constitutional mandate. FIFA suspended Kenya from all football activities for three months in 2004, due to the interference of the government in football activities. The ban was reversed after the country agreed to create new statutes. On October 25, 2006, Kenya was suspended again from international football for failing to fulfill a January 2006 agreement made to resolve recurrent problems in their football federation. FIFA announced that the suspension would be in force until the federation complies with the agreements previously reached. Rachel Kamweru is the Kenyan women football national chairperson. COSAFA and FIFA reaffirmed a commitment to women's football in the East African countries of Kenya, Ethiopia, Uganda and Tanzania in 2010.

Team image

Nicknames
The Kenya women's national football team has been known or nicknamed as the "Harambee Starlets".

Home stadium
Kenya plays their home matches on the Moi International Sports Centre.

National youth teams

Under-20

In 2006, the under-19 national team had 2 training sessions a week. The country participated in the African Women U-20 Championship 2006. They were supposed to play the Republic of Congo in Round 1 but the Republic of Congo withdrew from the competition. In the second round, they played Nigeria in Nigeria, losing 0–8.  At home in the return match, they lost 1–2. The under-20 national team competed in the 2010/2011 FIFA U-20 CAF Women's World Cup qualifying competition.  They did not advance to the U20 Women's World Cup. In the preliminary round, they tied Lesotho 2–2  in a home match for Lesotho.  In the home leg, they beat Lesotho 2–0. In the first round qualifiers, they lost to Zambia 2–1 in a home game for Zambia.  They beat Zambia 4–0 in the home leg.  In the qualifiers, they lost to Tunisia at home 1–2 in the second round. In 2012, the Zambian side was coached by Martha Kapombo. In the African qualification tournament for the U20 World Cup, Zambia lost to Kenya by an aggregate of 5–2  from the two matches, one home and away for both teams. Zambia lost the second match at Nyayo National Stadium in Nairobi by a score of 0–4.  In a mid-February game, they had beaten Kenya 2–1 at Sunset Stadium in Lusaka. Kapombo said of the second game, "We were not prepared to lose to Kenya; actually we knew that we were going to beat them by four goals like they did to us. They changed most of the players who we played with in Zambia and that made it very hard for us in the midfield which failed to click."  The Kenyan coach Florence Adhiambo said of the game ""We have come very far, we've been training hard and now we've seen what good training can do. We have worked hard to be here and the fans really played a very important role into this victory."  The leg winner was scheduled to play Tunisia in the second round. The Kenyans played Tunisian on 31 March 2012 at the Nyayo National Stadium in Tunisia.  In the lead up to the game, the team had a three-week training camp.  They were coached by Florence Adhiambo in the game. Ksh.700, 000 was given to the team by the Kenyan Prime Minister to support their World Cup aspirations.  Additional funding came from UNICEF, Procter and Gamble, and Coca-Cola.

Under-17

In 2006, the U-17 national team had 2 training sessions a week. They competed in the African Women U-17 Qualifying Tournament 2010. Botswana beat them in the opening round in a walkover win after Kenya withdrew from the tournament. The women's U-17 team competed in the CAF qualifiers for the FIFA U-17 World Cup that will be held in Azerbaijan in September 2012.  They did not advance out of their region. They played a qualification match in Abeokuta against Nigeria.

Results and fixtures

The following is a list of match results in the last 12 months, as well as any future matches that have been scheduled.

Legend

2022

Coaching staff

Current coaching staff

As of April 2021

Manager history
Justine Omojong Okiring (2014–2015)
David Ouma (2015–2017)
Ann Aluoch (2017–2019)
Paul Bitok (2019–2020)
David Ouma (2020–2021)
Charles Okere (2021–2022)
Baraka Olindah (2022-)

Players

Current squad
The following players were called up for the match against South Sudan on 23 October 2021.
Caps and goals accurate up to and including 10 October 2021.

Recent call ups

Captains 
 Doreen Nabwire (2013)
 Dorcas Nixon (2016–)

Previous squads
  Africa Women Cup of Nations  
2016 Africa Women Cup of Nations squads

Records

 Active players in bold, statistics correct as of 2020.

Most capped players

Top goalscorers

Competitive record

FIFA Women's World Cup

*Draws include knockout matches decided on penalty kicks.

Olympic Games

*Draws include knockout matches decided on penalty kicks.

Africa Women Cup of Nations

*Draws include knockout matches decided on penalty kicks.

African Games

CECAFA Women's Championship

Honours

All−time record against FIFA recognized nations
The list shown below shows the Djibouti national football team all−time international record against opposing nations.
*As of xxxxxx after match against  xxxx.
Key

Record per opponent
*As ofxxxxx after match against  xxxxx.
Key

The following table shows Djibouti's all-time official international record per opponent:

See also

Sport in Kenya
Football in Kenya
Women's football in Kenya
Kenya women's national under-20 football team
Kenya women's national under-17 football team
Kenya men's national football team

References

External links
Kenya women's national football team – official website at  
FIFA profile at  

 
African women's national association football teams